Leston Izaias do Nascimento Júnior (born 20 September 1978 in Divinópolis), known as Leston Júnior, is a Brazilian football coach, currently in charge of Campinense.

Early life
Born in Divinópolis, son of former athlete Leston Isaias (50s and 60s), Leston Izaias do Nascimento Júnior, was created in the middle of football. Were four years at Soccer Schools and six years in high-performance base teams.

Career
He began his career as a coach in 1999, in the categories of base of Cruzeiro. The front of the Children's Team, Leston was at the club from 1999 to 2001. In the youth level, past the clubs: Cruzeiro, Flamengo, Divinópolis EC, América Mineiro and Bahia.

11 years later, in 2010, she made her first job as a professional at Inter de Bebedouro. In 2012 Leston coached Olímpia, which was close to winning a place in Campeonato Paulista Série A2. In the same year, he was hired by the Guarani-MG, which prevented the fall of the Buggy to the second division of the State.

In 2014, he commanded Madureira, which led the team to the quarterfinals of the Campeonato Brasileiro Série C, being eliminated by the CRB. The following year he coached Tupi, where he led the club to the long-sought access to Campeonato Brasileiro Série B.

Honours 
 Botafogo da Paraiba
 Campeonato Paraibano: 2018

References

External links
  Official website

1978 births
Living people
People from Divinópolis
Brazilian football managers
Campeonato Brasileiro Série C managers
Guarani Esporte Clube (MG) managers
Madureira Esporte Clube managers
Tupi Football Club managers
Clube do Remo managers
Mogi Mirim Esporte Clube managers
Villa Nova Atlético Clube managers
Moto Club de São Luís managers
Botafogo Futebol Clube (PB) managers
Santa Cruz Futebol Clube managers
Floresta Esporte Clube managers
Sportspeople from Minas Gerais
Campinense Clube managers